Harvey and the Wallbangers were a 1980s jazz vocal harmony group, playing major festivals and the main Concert Halls in Europe and the UK, such as the Royal Albert Hall, Sadler's Wells, The Forum, Ronnie Scotts and the Berlin Tempodrom. The group also appeared on the Royal Variety Show and scores of other television programmes including Wogan, Russell Harty and Carrott's Lib.

Harvey and the Wallbangers recorded four albums on their own label (Hubbadots) and also The Jazz Album with Simon Rattle (EMI).

Band members
 Jeremy Taylor – Vocals, trombone, trumpet, percussion
 Harvey Brough – Vocals, saxes, organ, cor anglais, percussion
 Christopher Purves – Vocals, trumpet, percussion
 Jonny Griffiths – Vocals, Guitar, violin, phonofiddle, percussion, ukulele
 Neil "Reg" McArthur – Vocals, piano, guitar, harpsichord, melodica, percussion
 Richard Allen – Vocals, double bass, percussion
 Andrew Huggett – Drums

Early band members
 Paul Daniel – Vocals
 Russell Watson – Bass Vocals
 Brian Shelley – Vocals
 Peter Stephens – Piano
 Chris Cox – Bass

Stage shows
Each year the Wallbangers would put together a new stage show, normally premiered at the Edinburgh Festival (the only time they missed performing in Edinburgh was 1985). The shows were produced by a selection of inspiring Directors.

Radio Series
On 26 June 1985, the Wallbangers appeared on BBC Radio 2 (at 22.15) for the first of a series of five 15-minute Wednesday night shows of "music & mirth". The series was produced by Paul Mayhew-Archer and featured additional material by comedy writer James Hendrie. The short series was repeated again in April the following year.

This was followed in 1987, when the Wallbangers had their own half-hour Tuesday night radio show on BBC Radio 2.
Produced again by Paul Mayhew-Archer and written by James Hendrie, the series ran for 6 episodes, hosting a number of special guest celebrities.

In 1986 the band also provided music for an adaptation of Dario Fo's Archangels broadcast on BBC Radio 3.

Dissolution
After Griffiths left the band, the band decided to break up after a final tour. The band performed with Simon Rattle and the London Sinfonietta, later released on Rattle's Jazz Album.

The final show, on Sunday 3 May 1987, was originally booked at the Duke of York's Theatre in the West End, but having sold out in just a morning, it was finally moved to the Sadler's Wells Theatre in Clerkenwell, London, where the Wallbangers performed for the last time.

Stephen Grater (the band's manager for the past four years) had contracted a brain tumor, and died a few days before the final concert. According to Purves, this partly inspired the band members to stop.

Discography

Post-Wallbangers careers
Christopher Purves, who left the band due to the pressures of touring, trained as an operatic baritone and his first major role was in Inés de Castro by James MacMillan in 1997. He also played the lead roles in Alban Berg's Wozzeck and Verdi's Falstaff, Beckmesser in Wagner's Meistersinger, Tonio in Leoncavallo's Pagliacci and Balstrode in Britten's Peter Grimes. He also sang in a television commercial for fruit drink Um Bongo.

Harvey Brough followed the dissolution by scoring John Godber's Shakers with his brother Rex, providing what the Times described as "blues, country and Bananarama-ish tunes". But like Purves, he later went in a more serious direction, including composing and performing Requiem in Blue, a composition with elements of jazz, folk, and classical music, in tribute to his dead brother. He was married to jazz singer Jacqui Dankworth.

Harvey and the "New" Wallbangers

The members of the band worked together occasionally after the split. Harvey Brough was joined by the reunited Wallbangers for a 2004 concert at the Usher Hall in Edinburgh.

In 2016 Clara Sanabras asked Harvey to reform the Wallbangers to appear on one song (Travellers Never Did Lie) on her album "A Hum About Mine Ears". The CD was launched at the Barbican, London in March 2016, by Clara with the new Harvey and The Wallbangers, Britten Sinfonia, Jacqueline Shave, Violin and two choirs – Chorus of Dissent and Harvey's Vox Holloway conducted by Harvey.

In 2017, after a 30-year hiatus, three of the original Wallbangers (Harvey Brough, Jeremy Taylor & Richard Allen) plus two new Wallbangers (Clara Sanabras & Naomi Hammerton) decided to reform the band. They were joined by a rhythm section Andy Hamill and Roy Dodds to perform in three sold-out gigs in London and Southampton, followed by an appearance at the Bury St Edmunds music festival.

At the London shows the Wallbangers were joined on stage by original pianist "Reg Prescott", for the song Blue Skies.

Film and TV

See also 
 Harvey Wallbanger
 Harvey's Wallbangers

References

External links

Musical groups from Cambridge
British jazz ensembles